A zygoma fracture (zygomatic fracture) is a form of facial fracture caused by a fracture of the zygomatic bone. A zygoma fracture is often the result of facial trauma such as violence, falls or automobile accidents.

Symptoms include flattening of the face, trismus (reduced opening of the jaw) and lateral subconjunctival hemorrhage.

See also
 Zygomaticomaxillary complex fracture

References

Injuries of head
Bone fractures